Silonia silondia, the Silond catfish, is a species of schilbid catfish native to Pakistan, India, Bangladesh and Nepal  This species grows to a length of  TL.  These fish inhabit rivers and occur in shoals. Adults ascend from estuaries into large rivers for breeding during monsoons. After the water level recedes, they often get stranded in small pools.

References
 

Schilbeidae
Fish of Asia
Fish described in 1822